Pontiac-William Holliday School District 105 is a school district based in Fairview Heights, Illinois in the St. Louis Metropolitan Area. The district has two schools in Fairview Heights, William Holliday Elementary School and Pontiac Junior High School.

References

External links
 
 District History — brief history and class photos with names from multiple years

Education in St. Clair County, Illinois
School districts in Illinois